Events in the year 2017 in Sweden.

Incumbents
 Monarch – Carl XVI Gustaf
 Prime minister – Stefan Löfven

Events

 20 February – Rinkeby riots
 7 April – 2017 Stockholm truck attack
 1 July – The new Name Act of 2017 takes legal effect, replacing the Name Act of 1982

Sports
 22 October –
 Tennis: Juan Martín del Potro defeats  Grigor Dimitrov 6–4, 6–2 in the final of the 2017 Stockholm Open singles.
 Tennis: Oliver Marach and doubles partner Mate Pavić defeat Aisam-ul-Haq Qureshi and Jean-Julien Rojer in the 2017 Stockholm Open doubles.

Popular culture

Sports
 24 January – 5 February – The 2017 Bandy World Championship was held in Sweden. The Swedish team won gold medals, while Russia placed second and Finland placed third.

Deaths

 8 January – Nicolai Gedda, operatic tenor (b. 1925).
 9 January – Ulf Dinkelspiel, politician (b. 1939).
 23 January – Katja of Sweden, fashion designer (b. 1920).
 25 January – Siewert Öholm, journalist, television presenter (b. 1939).
 7 February – Hans Rosling, medical doctor, academic, statistician, and public speaker (b. 1948).
 16 February – Bengt Gustavsson, footballer and manager (b. 1928).
 1 June – Rosa Taikon, silversmith (b. 1926).
 13 June – Ulf Stark, author (b. 1944).
 15 June – Stina Haage, gymnast (b. 1924).
 27 June – Michael Nyqvist, actor (b. 1960).
 10 September – Hans Alfredson, actor (b. 1931).
 17 November – Rikard Wolff, actor and singer (b. 1958).

References

 
Years of the 21st century in Sweden
Sweden
Sweden
2010s in Sweden